The 2002 Enfield Council election took place on 2 May 2002 to elect members of Enfield London Borough Council in London, England. The whole council was up for election with boundary changes since the last election in 1998 reducing the number of seats by 3. The Conservative party gained overall control of the council from the Labour party.

Election result

Ward results

References

2002 London Borough council elections
2002